Muppets Haunted Mansion is a 2021 American puppet supernatural comedy Halloween special based on the Disney properties The Muppets and The Haunted Mansion. It was released on October 8, 2021, via Disney+. It is the Muppets' first Halloween special. The plot stars Gonzo and Pepe as they face the challenge of staying in a haunted mansion for one night. It received generally positive reviews from critics.

Plot
Instead of attending the Muppets' annual Halloween party, Gonzo and Pepe are on their way to a fear challenge event in the same haunted mansion where Gonzo's favorite magician, The Great MacGuffin, disappeared one-hundred years ago. Upon being dropped off by their hearse driver (Yvette Nicole Brown), Gonzo and Pepe meet the Caretaker (Darren Criss), along with several ghosts and singing busts.

Their "Ghost Host" (Will Arnett) tells Gonzo that he has been summoned to the mansion to see if he can survive one night. If he cannot, he and Pepe will be trapped there forever. While Gonzo claims that he fears nothing, Pepe is easily scared by everything he sees in the mansion. After meeting Madam Pigota (Miss Piggy), Gonzo and Pepe come across a room full of several ghosts resembling their Muppet friends. The Host soon appears and informs Gonzo that in order to survive the mansion he must face his fears in Room 999.

As Gonzo is led to the room, Pepe meets and becomes entranced by the ghost of Constance Hatchaway (Taraji P. Henson), who plans to marry and then kill him as he meets the ghosts of her past husbands. Gonzo is trapped in Room 999 (with the room's number sign turning upside down to read "666") and starts to turn old as his reflection taunts him. Recalling a conversation with Kermit he had earlier, Gonzo realizes he is indeed afraid of something: that no one will like him if he does not do dangerous stunts. He then remembers the Host's advice of facing his fears being the key to escaping the room after fearing he'll be trapped in the mansion forever. Finally, Gonzo ultimately realizes he is afraid of never seeing his friends again and the room de-ages and releases him.

The Host congratulates Gonzo for facing his fears and tells him that he is free to go so long as he makes it out by sunrise. After realizing that Pepe is in trouble, Gonzo refuses to leave without him. With the help of the Host's candelabra, Gonzo is able to find Pepe and stop the wedding. The pair jump out the window and make it out of the mansion just as the sun rises.

The Host meets them at the gate, revealing himself to be the Great MacGuffin, who is impressed that Gonzo was willing to do what he could not; face his fears. The hearse driver picks them up and Kermit calls asking to meet the pair for breakfast. He then comments that Gonzo and Pepe should bring their friends along, leading the two to turn and see the Hitchhiking Ghosts behind them.

Cast
 Will Arnett as the Host
 Yvette Nicole Brown as the Hearse Driver
 Darren Criss as the Caretaker
 Taraji P. Henson as the Bride
 Kim Irvine as Haunted Mansion Maid
 Quinn McPherson as Hallway Knight
 John Stamos as Famous Person

Ghosts
 Ed Asner as Claude
 Jeannie Mai as Maude
 Chrissy Metz as Harriet
 Alfonso Ribeiro as Fred
 Danny Trejo as Huet
 Sasheer Zamata as Mary

Singing Busts
 Skai Jackson
 Geoff Keighley
 Justina Machado
 Craig Robinson
 Pat Sajak

Muppet performers

 Dave Goelz as:
 The Great Gonzo
 Dr. Bunsen Honeydew as a Staring Bust
 Waldorf as a Happy Haunt
 Beauregard as George Hightower
 Randy Pig as a Happy Haunt
 Chip as himself and Pickwick the Chandelier Ghost
 Zoot as a member of Madame Pigota's ghost band
 Bill Barretta as:
 Pepe the King Prawn
 Rowlf the Dog as the Organist
 Dr. Teeth as a member of Madame Pigota's ghost band
 Johnny Fiama as Frank Banks
 Howard Tubman as a Happy Haunt
 Bobo the Bear as a Happy Haunt
 Big Mean Carl as a Happy Haunt
 Swedish Chef as a Happy Haunt
 Andy Pig as a Happy Haunt
 Bubba the Rat as a Happy Haunt
 Beautiful Day Monster as himself and as a Happy Haunt
 Clean Gene the Behemoth as himself and as a Happy Haunt
 Party Tomato
 Eric Jacobson as:
 Miss Piggy as herself and Madame Pigota
 Fozzie Bear as himself and Gauzey the Hatbox Bear
 Sam Eagle as a Duelist
 Animal as a member of Madame Pigota's ghost band
 Matt Vogel as:
 Kermit the Frog as himself and the Mansion Show host
 Floyd Pepper as a member of Madame Pigota's ghost band
 Pops as a Duelist
 Crazy Harry as a Happy Haunt
 Lew Zealand as Reginald Caine
 Uncle Deadly as the Justice of the Peace
 Sweetums as a Ghost Servant
 Peter Linz as:
 Walter as Ambrose Harper
 Robin the Frog as the Birthday Ghost
 Statler as a Happy Haunt
 Joe the Legal Weasel as a Happy Haunt
 Lips as a member of Madame Pigota's band
 The ghosts
 David Rudman as:
 Scooter as himself and as a Happy Haunt
 Janice as a member of Madame Pigota's band
 Beaker as a Staring Bust
 Wayne as a Happy Haunt
 Squid Ghost
 Brian Henson as:
 Sal Minella as Frank Banks's sidekick
 Julianne Buescher as:
 Yolanda Rat as a Happy Haunt
 Beverly Plume as a Happy Haunt
 Wanda as a Happy Haunt
 Screaming Goat
 Alice Dinnean as:
 Miss Cartier as a Happy Haunt
 Mummy
 Caretaker's Dog
 Pee Wee
 Bruce Lanoil as:
 Duddy
 Ballroom Rat
 Mo Frackle as a Happy Haunt (uncredited)
 Nicolette Santino as:
 Party Tomato
 Alex Villa as:
 Pumpkin

Production
Early attempts to produce a Halloween special centered on The Muppets date back to the early 1990s. Following Jim Henson's death, his son Brian planned to continue the franchise's presence on television by releasing a series of holiday specials, with the first one tentatively centered around Halloween. However, the project ultimately was cancelled, and the TV series Muppets Tonight was eventually released instead.

In March 2009, it was announced during a special event at Disney's Hollywood Studios, that The Walt Disney Company, who acquired The Muppets in 2004, was developing a Halloween special based on the franchise. A 2010 release date was later announced. However, the special was postponed in order for The Muppets Studio to focus entirely on the 2011 film, and eventually cancelled.

In May 2021, a Muppets Halloween special based on the Disney theme park attraction The Haunted Mansion, titled Muppets Haunted Mansion, was announced to be in development. Filming took place in April 2021 during eighteen days. In August 2021, longtime Muppet director Kirk Thatcher revealed that he wrote and directed the special, and shared a teaser image from it.

Later that month, Geoff Keighley and Darren Criss were revealed to be part of the cast as Uncle Theodore and The Caretaker, respectively, while Kelly Younger was revealed as co-writer. The rest of the cast was announced the following September.

Ed Mitchell and Steve Morrell wrote the music for the special, including three new songs, titled "Rest In Peace", "Life Hereafter", and "Tie The Knot Tango", as well as a cover of King Harvest's "Dancing in the Moonlight".

This was one of Ed Asner's final acting works before his death, and was dedicated to his memory.

Release
Muppets Haunted Mansion was released exclusively on Disney+ on October 8, 2021.
The special made its linear TV premiere on Disney Channel on October 22, 2022.

Reception

Audience viewership 
According to Whip Media, Muppets Haunted Mansion was the 6th most streamed movie across all platforms in the United States, during the week of October 10, 2021, and the 10th during the week of 17, 2021.

Critical response 
On review aggregation website Rotten Tomatoes, the film holds an approval rating of 73% based on 26 reviews, with an average rating of 6.20/10. Metacritic assigned the film a weighted average score of 67 out of 100, based on 4 critics, indicating "generally favorable reviews."

John Serba of Decider praised the humor of Muppets Haunted Mansion, saying, "Muppets Haunted Mansion is trifling silliness. It inspires some smiles, if not out-loud laughter." W. Andrew Powell of The GATE reviewed the show positively, stating, "Disney World’s Haunted Mansion meets The Muppets in one of the best, and most entertaining Muppet experiences in years." Victoria Rose Caister of GameRant.com complimented the series, stating that the "spooky elements are actually done in a very nice way," and the show is "a really solid watch that will be easy to throw on for kids or adults at Halloween time."

Garrett Martin of Paste rated the Halloween special 8 out of 10 and stated that Muppets Haunted Mansion recalls of the Muppet Show, saying, "It’s a silly, ultimately heartfelt hour destined to become a holiday favorite for fans of Disney parks, the Muppets, or just felt in general." Tara Bennett of IGN gave the series 8 out of 10, claiming, "The Muppets at their best are timeless, and this special captures much of that spirit." Polly Conway of Common Sense Media rated the Halloween special 4 out of 5 stars, stated the Halloween special promotes positive message and role models, such as being courageous and encouraging others, while complimenting the diverse representations across the portrayal of different origins.

Accolades

References

External links
 
 
 
 Muppets Haunted Mansion on Internet Archive

2020s American films
2020s English-language films
2020s ghost films
2021 comedy films
2021 films
American supernatural comedy films
American ghost films
American haunted house films
American supernatural horror films
Disney+ original films
Fictional places in Disney films
Films based on adaptations
Films based on multiple works
Films based on amusement park attractions
Films directed by Kirk Thatcher
Films set in country houses
Haunted Mansion
The Muppets films
The Muppets television specials
Children's and Family Emmy Award winners
American serial killer films
2020s horror films
2020s comedy horror films
2020s comedy films
2021 horror films